Social and behavior change communication (SBCC), often also only "BCC" or "Communication for Development (C4D)" is an interactive process of any intervention with individuals, group or community (as integrated with an overall program) to develop communication strategies to promote positive behaviors which are appropriate to their settings and thereby solving the world's most pressing health problems. This in turn provides a supportive environment which will enable people to initiate, sustain and maintain positive and desirable behavior outcomes.

SBCC is the strategic use of communication to promote positive health outcomes, based on proven theories and models of behavior change. SBCC employs a systematic process beginning with formative research and behavior analysis, followed by communication planning, implementation, and monitoring and evaluation. Audiences are carefully segmented, messages and materials are pre-tested, and mass media (which include radio, television, billboards, print material, internet), interpersonal channels (such as client-provider interaction, group presentations) and community mobilisation are used to achieve defined behavioral objectives.

BCC should not be confused with behavior modification, a term with specific meaning in a clinical psychiatry setting. SBCC differentiates itself from Social impact entertainment (SIE) primarily through its "impact first", rather than "story first", approach.

Background 
Providing people with information and teaching them how they should behave does not lead to desirable change in their response/behavior. However, when there is a supportive environment with information and communication (teaching) then there is a desirable change in the behavior of the target group. Thus, SBCC is proved to be an instructional intervention which has a close interface with education and communication. It is a strategic and group oriented form of communication to perceive a desired change in behavior of target group.

However, it is not as easy as it sounds, as there is no one-size-fits all strategy for any intervention. Interventions are context specific. Therefore, there is a need for proper information management and sharing. It is advised to document and report the interventions that worked somewhere, for example, the kind of messages, the medium and the audience.

Steps
SBCC is the comprehensive process in which one passes through the stages:

Unaware
> Aware
> Concerned
> Knowledgeable
> Motivated to change
> Practicing trial behavior change
> Sustained behavior change

It involves the following steps:
 State program goals
 Involve stakeholders
 Identify target populations
 Conduct formative BCC assessments
 Segment target populations
 Define behavior change objectives
 Define SBCC strategy & monitoring and evaluation plan
 Develop communication products
 Pretest
 Implement and monitor
 Evaluate
 Analyze feedback and revise

Enabling factors 
Behavior change is influenced by motivation from others (external influence) as well as from within oneself (internal influence). Internal influence plays a significant role in creating more enjoyment of a behavior change, instilling a sense of ownership of the new behavior, which in turn instills a sense of ownership of the changed behavior. When designing SBCC strategies, enabling factors that affect the outcome must be considered. The following are some of the factors:
 Effective communication
 Enabling environment, which include policies, human rights community values and norms
 User-friendly, accessible services and commodities

Theories
SBCC has several levels at which it can be implemented. Each level includes several theories. Each level (and each theory) employs specific communication channels.

Individual level
 Health belief model
 Theory of reasoned action and planned behavior
 Transtheoretical model/Stages of change
 Social learning theory

Community level
 Diffusion of innovations theory
 Community mobilization

Change in organizations
 4 stage change

Public policy Level
 Distinct stages of initiation, action, implementation, evaluation and re-formulation

Strategies
SBCC is different from the ordinary instructional method of communication and is target specific. A society consists of many sub-groups. The strategy for SBCC will vary from group to group. The following points are important while considering the SBCC strategy.
 Vulnerability/risk factor of the target group
 The vulnerability/risk factor of the group which is to be addressed
 The conflict and obstacles in the way to desired change in behavior
 Type of message and communication media which can best be used to reach the target group
 Type of resources available and assessment of existing knowledge of the target group about the issue which is going to be dealt with

There can be several more points in this list. A successful SBCC requires much research and meticulous planning about the knowledge content of the subject and behavior/attitude pattern of the target group.

Social marketing has been described as a tool for sustainable behaviour change.

Implications
SBCC has proven effective in several health areas, such as increasing the use of family planning methods, reducing the spread of malaria and other infectious diseases, and improving newborn and maternal health.

SBCC is an effective tool for dealing with many community and group related problems. BCC has been adapted as an effective strategy for community mobilization, health and environmental education and various public outreach programs.
Enhanced knowledge about the behavior change process has facilitated the design of communications programs to reduce the risk of HIV transmission and AIDS. A wide variety of health promotion strategies use communication as either an educational or norm-forming strategy. In addition, specific strategies must be designed for high-risk groups such as women, young people, injecting drug abusers, homosexuals and HIV positive groups.

Role in HIV/AIDS
SBCC consists of effective communication which is central to the success of interventions to reduce the risk of HIV infection. It plays a role to:

 Increase knowledge
 Stimulate community dialogue
 Promote essential attitude change
 Advocate for policy changes
 Create a demand for information and services
 Reduce stigma and discrimination
 Promote services for prevention and care

See also 
 Attitude change
 Behavior change method
 Behavior change (public health)
 Design for behaviour change
 Entertainment-Education
 Johns Hopkins University Center for Communication Programs
 Lifestyle medicine

References

External links
 Community Mobilization and Participation
 Behavior Change Communication Tools & Publications: FHI
 Development Communication – a research article by Kumar, Rajesh: https://web.archive.org/web/20130927085358/https://caluniv.ac.in/Global%20mdia%20journal/Winter%20Issue%20December%20%202011%20Articles/AR-3%20Kumar.pdf
 The Communication Initiative – a central knowledge base for experts in the field
 C4D Network – a localized, country-specific network for practitioners 

Behavioural sciences
Community
Community organizing
Attitude change
Communication